Vito Timmel (born Viktor von Thümmel; July 19, 1886 – January 1, 1949) was an Italian painter.

Biography
Viktor von Thümmel was a son of Raphael von Thümmel, a descendant of the Leipzig writer Moritz August von Thümmel, and the Countess Adele Scodellari from Friuli. Thanks to an inheritance, the family moved to Trieste, which then belonged to Austria, in 1890, where his mother founded a fashion shop in Piazza della Borsa.

From 1901 Thümmel attended the state trade school (Scuola per Capi d'Arte) in Trieste and learned the basics of painting from, among others, Eugenio Scomparini. In 1905 he went to the University of Applied Arts Vienna and in 1906 to the Academy of Fine Arts Vienna, where he came into contact with contemporary trends in painting, namely the Vienna Secession and Symbolism. In 1910, as part of his Grand Tour, he sojourned in the cities of Venice, Florence and Rome and then returned to Trieste. In 1909/1910 he completed the one-year military service in the Austro-Hungarian army.

Thümmel exhibited in Arezzo and Munich in 1910 and in Naples in 1913. In August 1914 he married Maria Ceresar, who died of tuberculosis in 1918. They had a son born in 1915. In 1921 he married Giulia Tomè.

Timmel worked as a painter, graphic artist, draftsman and decorator. In 1913 he decorated Trieste's Cinema Italia with a series of pictures, which were later transferred to the Revoltella Museum of Trieste, and painted the Theater of Monfalcone. During the First World War in 1916 he was drafted into the k.u.k. infantry regiment "von Waldstätten" No. 97 and was stationed in Radkersburg. Far away from all fronts, he could also paint there. Indeed, together with Argio Orell he realized the mural paintings of the club Bohem.

In the 1920s he developed an active painting activity and exhibited in Trieste and in various Italian cities. He then went astray, left his family and installed himself as a painter in Civitavecchia. His girlfriend Anita Pittoni (1901–1982) brought him back to Trieste. In the 1930s, his mental health deteriorated. Timmel was treated as an inpatient in the psychiatry from 1946. He kept a diary from which excerpts were edited in 1973.

The play La mostra by Claudio Magris, published in 2001, is about Timmel's disease. In 2006 Calenda restaged the play, again with Herlitzka as  Timmel.

Gallery

References

1886 births
1949 deaths
20th-century Austrian painters
Austrian male painters
Vienna Secession
Artists from Vienna
University of Applied Arts Vienna alumni
Academy of Fine Arts Vienna alumni
20th-century Austrian male artists